The Nearness of You is an album of jazz standards by pianist Paul Bley recorded in Denmark in 1988 and released on the SteepleChase label.

Reception

Allmusic awarded the album 4 stars stating "This is Bley at his level jamming best. If this had been a cutting session, I'd have hated to be the horn player".

Track listing
 "This Can't Be Love" (Lorenz Hart, Richard Rodgers) - 5:35   
 "The Nearness of You" (Hoagy Carmichael, Ned Washington) - 12:54   
 "What a Difference a Day Makes" (Stanley Adams, María Mendez Grever) - 7:28   
 "These Foolish Things" (Harry Link, Holt Marvell, Jack Strachey) - 4:35 Bonus track on CD  
 "Blues in the Closet" (Oscar Pettiford) - 11:30 Bonus track on CD  
 "Lullaby of Birdland" (George Shearing, George David Weiss) - 6:20   
 "We'll Be Together Again" (Carl Fischer, Frankie Laine) - 10:44   
 "Take the "A" Train" (Billy Strayhorn) - 6:50

Personnel 
Paul Bley - piano
Ron McClure - bass 
Billy Hart - drums

References 

1989 albums
Paul Bley albums
SteepleChase Records albums